Mount Macklin is a mainly snow-covered ridge with an exposed summit at  just east of Mount Shaw in the Anare Nunataks of Mac. Robertson Land, Antarctica. It was first visited in November 1955 by an Australian National Antarctic Research Expeditions party led by J.M. Béchervaise, and was named by the Antarctic Names Committee of Australia for Eric Macklin, a radio operator at Mawson Station in 1955.

References

Mountains of Mac. Robertson Land